Chasing Shadows is an ITV crime drama first aired on 4 September 2014. The series follows the work of a missing persons unit, and stars Reece Shearsmith as protagonist Sean Stone, a detective Sergeant, and Alex Kingston, as advisor Ruth Hattersley. The series of four episodes concluded on 25 September 2014. On 7 April 2016, the series was made available to view on the ITV Hub.

Plot
D.S. Sean Stone (Reece Shearsmith) is intense and socially awkward, a misfit who is happier dealing with data rather than people. His lack of people skills and forthright honesty make him some powerful enemies in the force, and he finds himself exiled to missing persons. Sean's new caseload is overwhelming - up to 300,000 people go missing in the UK each year - but his brilliant mind turns out to be perfectly adapted to his new role. Where others see a hopeless, ever-growing sea of lost faces, Sean spots patterns, that lead to victims... and their killers. Ruth Hattersley (Alex Kingston) is the analyst from the Missing Persons Bureau tasked with working alongside Sean. She puts people first - a born connector able to get on with anyone, but Sean pushes even her patience to breaking point. DCI Pryor (Noel Clarke) has ambitions and a clear plan for rising up the ranks. But all this is jeopardised when DS Stone becomes his responsibility.

Cast
 Reece Shearsmith as D.S. Sean Stone, a detective sergeant assigned to the Missing Persons Bureau
 Alex Kingston as Ruth Hattersley, a data analyst for the Bureau
 Noel Clarke as D.C.I. Carl Pryor, Stone's superior officer
 Don Warrington as Chief Supt. Harley Drayton, the commander of the Missing Persons Bureau
 Adjoa Andoh as Angela Bale, one of Ruth's colleagues
 Alfie Field as Bryan Hattersley, Ruth's son
 Lynda Baron as Maggie Hattersley, Ruth's mother
 Doug Allen as D.I. Gary Scanlon, Pryor's second-in-command
 Myriam Acharki as Adele Rivera, Stone's housekeeper

Episodes

References

Further reading

External links

2014 British television series debuts
2014 British television series endings
2010s British drama television series
2010s British crime television series
British detective television series
ITV television dramas
2010s British television miniseries
Television series by ITV Studios
English-language television shows